"Icarus" is a song performed by French DJ and record producer Madeon. It was released on 24 February 2012 as a digital download in the United Kingdom. Additionally, 500 copies of the extended mix were sold on vinyl records. The single entered the UK Singles Chart at number 22. The album art depicts Sydney, Australia's city skyline. The song features on the deluxe edition of his debut studio album, Adventure (2015).

Track listing

Chart performance

Release history

References

2012 singles
2012 songs
Madeon songs
Song recordings produced by Madeon
Songs written by Madeon